Phyllonorycter chrysella is a moth of the family Gracillariidae. It is known from southern France, Spain and Italy.

The larvae feed on Alnus glutinosa and Alnus incana. They mine the leaves of their host plant. They create a relatively small, lower-surface tentiform mine with many fine length folds. It is always positioned in an axle of the midrib and side vein. The mine causes the leaf to contract strongly. Pupation takes place within the mine.

References

chrysella
Moths of Europe
Moths described in 1885